Nikolai Hentsch (born 10 August 1983) is a Brazilian alpine skier. He competed at the 2002 Winter Olympics and the 2006 Winter Olympics.

References

External links
 

1983 births
Living people
People with acquired Brazilian citizenship
Brazilian male alpine skiers
Olympic alpine skiers of Brazil
Alpine skiers at the 2002 Winter Olympics
Alpine skiers at the 2006 Winter Olympics
Brazilian people of Swiss descent
Sportspeople from Geneva
Swiss male alpine skiers
Swiss people of Brazilian descent
Sportspeople of Brazilian descent